The 2018 World Men's Curling Championship (branded as the 361˚ World Men's Curling Championship 2018 for sponsorship reasons) was held from March 31 to April 8, 2018 at Orleans Arena, on the Las Vegas Strip in Paradise, Nevada, United States.

In a rematch of the 2017 gold medal game, the Swedish team led by Niklas Edin beat the defending champion Canadian team led by Brad Gushue 7–3 in the final to win the championship. In the game, Edin led 5–0 after five ends, thanks in part to stealing two in the fourth end when Gushue was light on a draw to the four-foot and another steal in the fifth after a missed runback double. Canada condeded the game after eight ends, and won the silver medal. It was the eighth championship for Sweden, and the third for Edin. Scotland, skipped by Bruce Mouat won the bronze.

Qualification
The following nations are qualified to participate in the 2018 World Men's Curling Championship:
 (host country)
One team from the Americas zone
 (winner of the 2018 Americas Challenge)
Eight teams from the 2017 European Curling Championships

Three teams from the 2017 Pacific-Asia Curling Championships

Teams

Round-robin standings
Final round-robin standings

WCT ranking
Year to date World Curling Tour order of merit ranking for each team prior to the event.

Round-robin results
All draw times are listed in Pacific Daylight Time (UTC−7:00).

Draw 1
Saturday, March 31, 13:30

Draw 2
Saturday, March 31, 18:30

Draw 3
Sunday, April 1, 08:30

Draw 4
Sunday, April 1, 13:30

Draw 5
Sunday, April 1, 18:30

Draw 6
Monday, April 2, 08:30

Draw 7
Monday, April 2, 13:30

Draw 8
Monday, April 2, 18:30

Draw 9
Tuesday, April 3, 08:30

Draw 10
Tuesday, April 3, 13:30

Draw 11
Tuesday, April 3, 18:30

Draw 12
Wednesday, April 4, 08:30

Draw 13
Wednesday, April 4, 13:30

Draw 14
Wednesday, April 4, 18:30

Draw 15
Thursday, April 5, 08:30

Draw 16
Thursday, April 5, 13:30

Draw 17
Thursday, April 5, 18:30

Draw 18
Friday, April 6, 08:30

Draw 19
Friday, April 6, 13:30

Draw 20
Friday, April 6, 18:30

Playoffs

Qualification games
Saturday, April 7, 08:30

Semifinal 1
Saturday, April 7, 13:30

Semifinal 2
Saturday, April 7, 18:30

Bronze medal game
Sunday, April 8, 12:00

Gold medal game
Sunday, April 8, 17:00

Statistics

Top 5 player percentages
Round robin only

Perfect games

References

External links

2018
2018 in curling
2018 in sports in Nevada
2018
21st century in Las Vegas
March 2018 sports events in the United States
April 2018 sports events in the United States
2018
Curling in Nevada
World Men's Curling Championship 2018